William J. Henry (December 2, 1867  November 26, 1955) was an American hymn writer and evangelist.

He originated from Ohio. He was an early leader in the Holiness Movement near Boyertown, Pennsylvania. From 1889 to 1895, he toured eastern Pennsylvania and New Jersey for several months each year, holding revival meetings. In 1893, he traveled to Liverpool, England, and founded a small congregation there. He later founded a congregation in Springfield, Missouri, which he served as pastor for 13 years.

He wrote more than 300 hymns, several of which continue to be included in hymnals. Some have been translated into German and Scandinavian languages. One of his hymns, "Fully Saved Today" (1911), is the basis of the gospel blues song "Church, I'm Fully Saved To-Day" (1930) by the Texan Blind Willie Johnson.

References 

1867 births
1955 deaths
American Christian hymnwriters
Songwriters from Ohio
People from Toledo, Ohio